The Merchant Marine Act of 1920 is a United States federal statute that provides for the promotion and maintenance of the American merchant marine. Among other purposes, the law regulates maritime commerce in U.S. waters and between U.S. ports. Section 27 of the Merchant Marine Act is known as the Jones Act  and deals with cabotage (coastwise trade).  It requires that all goods transported by water between U.S. ports be carried on ships that have been constructed in the United States and that fly the U.S. flag, are owned by U.S. citizens, and are crewed by U.S. citizens and U.S. permanent residents. The act was introduced by Senator Wesley Jones. The law also defines certain seaman's rights.

The Merchant Marine Act of 1920 has been revised a number of times; the most recent revision in 2006 included recodification in the U.S. Code.

Many economists and other experts have argued for its repeal, while military and U.S. Department of Commerce officials have spoken in favor of the law on protectionist grounds. The Act reduces domestic trade via waterways (relative to other forms of trade) and increases consumer prices.

The Jones Act is not to be confused with: the Death on the High Seas Act (another U.S. maritime law that does not apply to coastal and in-land navigable waters), or the Passenger Vessel Services Act of 1886 (which regulates passenger vessels, including cruise ships).

History
Laws similar to the Jones Act date to the early days of the United States. In the First Congress, on September 1, 1789, Congress enacted Chapter XI, "An Act for Registering and Clearing Vessels, Regulating the Coasting Trade, and for other purposes", which limited domestic trades to American ships meeting certain requirements. Such laws served the same purpose as—and were loosely based on—England's Navigation Acts, which were repealed in 1849.

The laws requiring that vessels transporting cargo domestically be U.S.-built, owned, and crewed, were temporarily suspended during World War I. The Jones Act of 1920 reinstated those ideas into law, and expanded restrictions regarding vessels used for cabotage in the United States.

1920 law
The Merchant Marine Act of 1920 was introduced by Senator Wesley Jones, Chairman of the Senate Commerce Committee. He stated that the act was, "an earnest effort to lay the foundation of a policy that will build up and maintain an adequate American merchant marine in competition with the shipping of the world."

The intention of Congress was to develop a merchant marine for reasons of national defense and of growth of foreign and domestic commerce, as stated in the preamble to the Merchant Marine Act of 1920 as originally enacted:

1936 law
The Merchant Marine Act of 1936 was a major update to the law. Its purpose is "to further the development and maintenance of an adequate and well-balanced American merchant marine, to promote the commerce of the United States, to aid in the national defense, to repeal certain former legislation, and for other purposes."

Specifically, it established the United States Maritime Commission, and required a United States Merchant Marine that:

 can carry all domestic water-borne commerce,
 can carry a substantial portion of foreign commerce,
 can serve as a naval auxiliary in time of war or national emergency,
 is owned and operated under the U.S. flag by U.S. citizens "insofar as may be practicable,"
 is composed of the best-equipped, safest, and most suitable types of vessels,
 consists of vessels constructed in the United States, and
 consists of vessels manned with a trained and efficient citizen personnel.

The Act restricted the number of aliens allowed to work on passenger ships, requiring that, by 1938, 90 percent of the crew members were U.S. citizens.  Although about 4,000 Filipinos worked as merchant mariners on U.S. ships, most of these seamen were discharged in 1937 as a result of the law.  The Act also established federal subsidies for the construction and operation of merchant ships.  Two years after the Act was passed, the U.S. Merchant Marine Cadet Corps, the forerunner to the United States Merchant Marine Academy, was established.

U.S. Representative Schyler O. Bland of Virginia was known as the "father of the Merchant Marine Act of 1936."

Law revisions
The Merchant Marine Act of 1920 has been further revised a number of times. In 1940, Congress expanded the Jones Act to cover towing vessels. In 1988, Congress specified that waterborne transport of valueless material, such as dredge spoil or municipal solid waste, requires the use of a Jones Act-qualified vessel.

The revision of the law in 2006 included recodification in the U.S. Code.

Cabotage

Cabotage is the transport of goods or passengers between two points in the same country, alongside coastal waters, by a vessel or an aircraft registered in another country.  Originally a shipping term, cabotage now also covers aviation, railways, and road transport.  Cabotage is "trade or navigation in coastal waters, or the exclusive right of a country to operate the air traffic within its territory". In the context of "cabotage rights", cabotage refers to the right of a company from one country to trade in another country. In aviation terms, for example, it is the right to operate within the domestic borders of another country. Most countries enact cabotage laws for reasons of economic protectionism or national security; 80% of the UN's member states with coastlines have cabotage law.

The cabotage provisions relating to the Jones Act restrict the carriage of goods or passengers between United States ports to U.S.-built and flagged vessels. It has been codified as portions of 46 U.S.C.  Generally, the Jones Act prohibits any foreign-built, foreign-owned or foreign-flagged vessel from engaging in coastwise trade within the United States. A number of other statutes affect coastwise trade and should be consulted along with the Jones Act. These provisions also require at least three-fourths (75 percent) of the crew members to be U.S. citizens or permanent residents. Moreover, the steel of foreign repair work on the hull and superstructure of a U.S.-flagged vessel is limited to ten percent by weight. This restriction largely prevents Jones Act ship-owners from refurbishing their ships at overseas shipyards.

Seamen's rights
The act formalized the rights of seamen.

The Jones Act allows injured sailors to make claims and obtain damages from their employers for the negligence of the ship owner, including many acts of the captain or fellow members of the crew. It operates simply by extending similar legislation already in place that allowed for recoveries by railroad workers and providing that this legislation also applies to sailors.

The law allows U.S. seamen to bring actions against ship owners based on claims of unseaworthiness or negligence, rights not afforded by common international maritime law.

The United States Supreme Court, in the case of Chandris, Inc., v. Latsis, 515 U.S. 347, 115 S.Ct. 2172 (1995), has set a benchmark for determining the status of any employee as a "Jones Act" seaman. Workers who spend less than 30 percent of their time in the service of a vessel on navigable waters are presumed not to be seaman under the Jones Act. The Court ruled that any worker who spends more than 30 percent of his time in the service of a vessel on navigable waters qualifies as a seaman under the act. Only maritime workers who qualify as a seaman can file a suit for damages under the Jones Act.

An action under the Jones Act may be brought either in a U.S. federal court or in a state court. The right to bring an action in state court is preserved by the "savings to suitors" clause, 28 U.S.C. § 1333. The seaman-plaintiff is entitled to a jury trial, a right which is not afforded in maritime law absent a statute authorizing it.

Seamen have three years from the time the accident occurred to file a lawsuit. Under the Jones Act, maritime law has a statute of limitations of three years, meaning that seamen have three years from the time the injury occurred to file a lawsuit. If an injured seaman does not file a case within that three-year period, the seaman's claim may be dismissed as time-barred.

Effects
The Jones Act prevents foreign-flagged ships from carrying cargo between the contiguous U.S. and certain noncontiguous parts of the U.S., such as Puerto Rico, Hawaii, Alaska, and Guam. Foreign ships inbound with goods cannot stop at any of these four locations, offload goods, load contiguous-bound goods, and continue to U.S. contiguous ports, although ships can offload cargo and proceed to the contiguous U.S. without picking up any additional cargo intended for delivery to another U.S. location.

Puerto Rico
In June 2012, the Federal Reserve Bank of New York indicated that the Jones Act may hinder economic development in Puerto Rico, although a Government Accountability Office report found the effect of repealing or loosening is uncertain, with possible tradeoffs.

In March 2013, the Government Accountability Office (GAO) released a study of the effect of the Jones Act on Puerto Rico that noted "[f]reight rates are set based on a host of supply and demand factors in the market, some of which are affected directly or indirectly by Jones Act requirements."  The report further concludes, however, that "because so many other factors besides the Jones Act affect rates, it is difficult to isolate the exact extent to which freight rates between the United States and Puerto Rico are affected by the Jones Act." The report also addresses what would happen "under a full exemption from the Act, the rules and requirements that would apply to all carriers would need to be determined."  The report continues that "[w]hile proponents of this change expect increased competition and greater availability of vessels to suit shippers' needs, it is also possible that the reliability and other beneficial aspects of the current service could be affected."  The report concludes that "GAO's report confirmed that previous estimates of the so-called 'cost' of the Jones Act are not verifiable and cannot be proven."

U.S. shipbuilding
Because the Jones Act requires all transport between U.S. ports be carried on U.S.-built ships, proponents of the Jones Act claim that it supports the domestic U.S. shipbuilding industry. Shipyards that build Jones Act vessels are needed to build smaller but important government vessels like auxiliary ships, cutters, and research vessels. Jones Act requirements creates additional work for these shipyards in between government orders. Proponents state that by keeping the industrial base working, the Jones Act ensures that the Navy and Marine Corps can spin up shipbuilding without relying on other nations. The defense think tank CSBA, in a 2020 study on the maritime industry, warned that without the Jones Act, the shipbuilding industry would face dire impacts, up to and including the inability of the government to purchase any auxiliary ships domestically.

Critics of the act describe it as protectionist, harming the overall economy for the sake of benefiting narrow interests. A 2014 report by The Heritage Foundation argues that the Jones Act is an ineffective way to promote U.S. shipbuilding, claiming it drives up shipping costs, increases energy costs, stifles competition, and hampers innovation in the U.S. shipping industry. A 2019 Congressional Research Service report stated that U.S. shipbuilding has declined in competitiveness since the law's passage.

The Organization for Economic Cooperation and Development (OECD) estimated in 2019 that repealing the Jones Act would boost shipbuilding output by more than $500 million.

National security 
One of the primary impetuses for the law was the situation that occurred during World War I when the belligerent countries withdrew their merchant fleets from commercial service to aid in the war effort.  This left the US with insufficient vessels to conduct normal trade impacting the economy. Later when the U.S. joined the war there were insufficient vessels to transport war supplies, materials, and ultimately soldiers to Europe resulting in the creation of the United States Shipping Board. The U.S. engaged in a massive ship building effort including building concrete ships to make up for the lack of U.S. tonnage. The Jones Act was passed in order to prevent the U.S. from having insufficient maritime capacity in future wars.

Homeland Security 
The Jones Act includes dredging and salvage operations. Because the Jones Act creates a domestic dredging and salvage industry in the United States, it prevents the United States from depending on foreign companies to dredge naval facilities, which could create opportunities for sabotage or the depositing of underwater surveillance equipment.

Additionally, the requirement that ships in the domestic fleet be manned by crews of U.S. citizens or permanent residents reduces the likelihood foreign ships and mariners will illegally gain access to America's inland waterways and associated infrastructure. A 2011 study by the Government Accountability Office (GAO) found there are approximately 5 million maritime crew entries into the United States each year, and "the overwhelming majority of seafarers entering U.S. ports are aliens." The study also showed that 80% of those seafarer aliens are working on passenger ships that are covered by the Passenger Vessel Services Act of 1886 rather than the Jones Act. The GAO said that while there are no known examples of foreign seafarer involvement in terrorist attacks and no definitive evidence of extremists infiltrating the United States on seafarer visas, "the Department of Homeland Security (DHS) considers the illegal entry of an alien through a U.S. seaport by exploitation of maritime industry practices to be a key concern."

Importation of liquefied natural gas 
Because of the lack of Jones Act-compliant liquefied natural gas tankers, the Northeast of the U.S. imported liquefied natural gas from Russia in order to avoid shortages in 2018.

Support
Supporters of the Jones Act maintain that the legislation is of strategic economic and wartime interest to the United States. The act, they say, protects the nation's sealift capability and its ability to produce commercial ships. In addition, the act is seen as a vital factor in helping maintain a viable workforce of trained merchant mariners for commerce and national emergencies. Supporters also argue that allowing foreign-flagged ships to engage in commerce in domestic American sea lanes would undermine U.S. wage, tax, safety, and environmental standards.

According to the Lexington Institute, the Jones Act is also vital to national security and plays a role in safeguarding America's borders. The Lexington Institute stated in a June 2016 study that the Jones Act plays a role in strengthening U.S. border security and helping to prevent international terrorism.

Criticism

Protectionism

Critics claim the Jones Act is protectionist, and point to a 2002 report by the United States International Trade Commission that estimated the savings for the U.S. economy that would result from the repeal or amendment of the Jones Act. Critics contend that the Act results in higher costs for moving cargo between U.S. ports, particularly for Americans living in Hawaii, Alaska, Guam, and Puerto Rico.

A 2019 study by the OECD estimated that the economic gains to the U.S. economy from the repeal of Jones Act would range from an added $19 billion up to $64 billion.

Efforts at repeal

Legislative efforts to repeal the Jones Act have been repeatedly introduced in Congress since 2010 in the form of the Open America's Waters Act, championed by the late Senator John McCain and by Utah Senator Mike Lee, but have not passed to become law.

Waivers
Requests for waivers of the Act and its provisions are reviewed by the Department of Homeland Security on a case-by-case basis, and can only be granted based on interest of national defense. Historically, waivers have only been granted in cases of national emergencies or upon the request of the Secretary of Defense.

In the wake of Hurricane Katrina, Homeland Security Secretary Michael Chertoff temporarily waived the coastwise laws for foreign vessels carrying oil and natural gas from September 1 to 19, 2005.

In order to conduct an emergency shipment of gasoline from Dutch Harbor, Alaska, to Nome in January 2012, Secretary of Homeland Security Janet Napolitano granted a waiver to the Russian ice class marine tanker Renda.

The Secretary of Homeland Security issued a temporary conditional waiver of the Jones Act for the shipment of petroleum products, blending stocks and additives from Gulf Coast Petroleum Administration for Defense District (PADD 3) to the New England and Central Atlantic Petroleum Administration for Defense Districts (PADDs 1 a and 1 b, respectively)  for 12 days from November 2 to 13, 2012, following widespread fuel shortages caused by Hurricane Sandy.

On September 8, 2017, the Jones Act was simultaneously suspended for both Hurricane Harvey, which hit Texas fourteen days prior, and Hurricane Irma, which hit Florida on that day.  In the same month, the Act was waived, after two days of debate, for Puerto Rico in the aftermath of Hurricane Maria.

Requests for waivers of certain provisions of the act are reviewed by the United States Maritime Administration (MARAD) on a case-by-case basis. Waivers have been granted for example, in cases of national emergencies or in cases of strategic interest. For example, in June, 2006, declining oil production prompted MARAD to grant a waiver to operators of the 512-foot Chinese vessel Tai An Kou to tow an oil rig from the Gulf of Mexico to Alaska. The jackup rig will be under a two-year contract to drill in the Alaska's Cook Inlet Basin. The waiver to the Chinese vessel is said to be the first of its kind granted to an independent oil-and-gas company.

Pressure exerted by 21 agriculture groups, including the American Farm Bureau Federation, failed to secure a Jones Act waiver following Hurricane Katrina in the Gulf of Mexico. The groups contended that farmers would be adversely affected without additional shipping options to transport grains and oilseeds.

See also
 Flag of convenience
 Passenger Vessel Services Act of 1886  similar law concerning passenger transportation between US ports.
 Seaman status in United States admiralty law

References

Further reading

External links
 Text of the Merchant Marine Act of 1920 (Jones Act)
 University of Virginia Law Library, The Shipping Act and Merchant Marine Act 1920
 Testimony by Deputy Maritime Administrator on September 15, 1998 in Support of the Jones Act

1920 in American law
United States federal admiralty and maritime legislation
Protectionism in the United States